Theonina is a genus of sheet weavers that was first described by Eugène Louis Simon in 1929.

Species
 it contains five species.
Theonina canaan Tanasevitch, 2020 – Israel
Theonina cornix (Simon, 1881) (type) – Europe, North Africa
Theonina kratochvili Miller & Weiss, 1979 – Central Europe to Greece and Ukraine, Russia (Europe, Caucasus)
Theonina laguncula (Denis, 1937) – Morocco, Algeria, Spain, Cyprus
Theonina linyphioides (Denis, 1937) – Algeria

See also
 List of Linyphiidae species (Q–Z)

References

Araneomorphae genera
Linyphiidae
Spiders of Africa
Spiders of Russia